Bruitparif is a non-profit environmental organization responsible for monitoring the environmental noise in the Paris agglomeration.  It was founded in 2004.

Mission 
Bruitparif is a non-profit organisation accredited by the région Île-de-France, and the Ministry of Environment to monitor the environmental noise in Île-de-France. Its missions meet a regulatory requirement and come in three functions:
 Measurements and assessments
 Support to public policies
 Awareness actions

Bruitparif monitor continuously a network of 45 long-term measurement stations named "Rumeur". They contribute to the assessment of health risks and environmental impacts though campaigns of awareness in schools and general media.

Harmonica Index 
In 2014, Bruitparif and Acoucité created a European wide noise index named "Harmonica".

The Rumeur network 
"Rumeur" is a network of 45 long-term measurement stations spread across the region Île-de-France.

The Sonopode 
Bruitparif designed a specific autonomous equipment to house the measurement station. The sonopode contains a noise station, acoustic detection, wind station and a methanol fuel cell.

See also 
 Noise pollution, Environmental noise
 Noise map
 Sound level meter, Acoustical Engineering
 Health effects from noise

References

External links 
 Official website of Bruitparif (in French)
 Official website of the Harmonica index

Noise pollution
Audiology organizations
Organizations based in Paris
Environmental organizations based in France
2004 establishments in France